Epiplatys grahami is a species of fish in the family Nothobranchiidae, an African rivuline, which is native to the fresh water habitats in southeastern Benin, through southern Nigeria and Cameroon, to northwestern Equatorial Guinea.

Etymology
This killifish is named in honor of medical entomologist W. M. Graham, who specialized in blood-sucking midges, and was the director of the Medical Research Institute in Lagos, Nigeria. It was he who presented the type specimen to the British Museum of Natural History.

References

Wildekamp, R.H., 1996. A world of killies. Atlas of the oviparous cyprinodontiform fishes of the world. Volume III: The genera Empetrichthys, Epiplatys, Episemion, Floridichthys, Fluviphylax, Foerschichthys, Fundulopanchax,. Fundulosoma and Fundulus. American Killifish Association, Inc. 330 p.

grahami
Taxa named by George Albert Boulenger
Fish described in 1911